Ameeta Chavan is an Indian politician belonging to the Indian National Congress party. She is the wife of Ashok Chavan, a former chief minister of the state Maharashtra. She is a Member of Legislative Assembly (MLA) of the state; she won from the Bhokar (Vidhan Sabha constituency) in 2014 Maharashtra Legislative Assembly election. defeating BJP's Dr. Madhavrao Kinhalkar.

Position held

 Vice-President: Sharda Bhavan Education Society, Nanded
 V.P.- Bhaurao Chavan Co-operative Sugar Industry, Degaon-Yelegaon Dist. Nanded

References

Living people
Indian National Congress politicians from Maharashtra
Marathi politicians
Maharashtra MLAs 2014–2019
People from Marathwada
Year of birth missing (living people)
Place of birth missing (living people)
People from Nanded
21st-century Indian women politicians
21st-century Indian politicians
Women members of the Maharashtra Legislative Assembly